Master is a 2021 Indian Tamil-language action film written and directed by Lokesh Kanagaraj. It was produced by S. Xavier Britto, under his maiden production house, XB Film Creators, and co-produced by S. S. Lalit Kumar and Jagadish Palanisamy, under Seven Screen Studio. It stars Vijay and Vijay Sethupathi in the lead roles. Shanthanu Bhagyaraj, Malavika Mohanan, Andrea Jeremiah, Arjun Das and Gouri G. Kishan play supporting roles. The film revolves around an alcoholic professor, J. D. (Vijay), who takes a three-month teaching job in a juvenile home and clashes with a ruthless gangster named Bhavani (Vijay Sethupathi), who uses the children as the scapegoat for his criminal activities.

Lokesh Kanagaraj narrated the script to Vijay in May 2019, and after his acceptance, the film was launched under in August 2019. Kanagaraj wrote the script, screenplay and dialogues with Rathna Kumar and Pon Parthiban being credited as the co-writer. The principal photography commenced in October 2019 and ended in February 2020; the entire film was shot across Delhi, Mumbai, Chennai and Karnataka within 129 working days. Originally launched under the tentative title Thalapathy 64, the official title Master was announced on 31 December 2019. The music is composed by Anirudh Ravichander, while cinematography and editing are performed by Sathyan Sooryan and Philomin Raj respectively.

Master was initially planned for a theatrical release on 9 April 2020, but was postponed due to the COVID-19 pandemic in India. The makers preferred to wait for a theatrical release, rather than releasing it on any over-the-top media service. After being delayed for several months, the film finally was released in theatres on 13 January 2021, a day before Pongal. In addition, the film was simultaneously dubbed and released in Telugu, Kannada and Hindi (titled Vijay the Master) languages. Master also became the fastest Tamil film to be streamed on a digital platform, where the makers teamed up with Amazon Prime Video and premiered after 16 days of theatrical release on 29 January 2021, along with a Malayalam dubbed version.

The film received mixed to positive reviews from critics, with praise for the performances, direction, story, cinematography, soundtrack, musical score and action sequences but the predictability and lengthy runtime was criticized. It was the first Indian film to have occupied the first position in the global box office at the time of release. Irrespective of the fragmented theatrical release, and the early digital premiere, the film grossed around 220–300 crore, thus becoming one of the highest-grossing Tamil films of all time. Many trade analysts and exhibitors praised the film's team for the revival of the theatrical business in Tamil Nadu which suffered heavy losses due to the pandemic. Master was released in Malaysia a month later after its original release date.

Plot 
2002: In Nagercoil, a timid 17-year-old Bhavani witnesses his family's murder by his father's rivals. He is forced to take the blame and is incarcerated in a juvenile detention facility, where he is tortured mercilessly. As a consequence, he develops a ruthless and brash persona. Years later, Bhavani is released from the facility and becomes the owner of the lorry and trade business. Gradually, he becomes a feared gangster and remains immune from punishment by coercing the inmates of the detention facility to take the blame for his crimes. Creating an enormous syndicate for himself, he grows on par with his father's former rivals and eventually kills them.

2019: In Chennai, John Durairaj (J.D) is a college lecturer beloved by his students for his student-friendly approach. He struggles with alcoholism and bitter dislike from fellow staff. Charulatha aka Charu, a newly hired lecturer at his college is the only one who sympathizes with him. J.D decides to uphold an election in the school on a bet with the college principal that stakes his dismissal from the college if the election were to fail. Despite the initial election going successfully, the school comes under attack from various goons that were unpleased with the result. Since the election finished awry, he is assigned to a juvenile detention facility for a 3-month assignment that he does not remember volunteering for. J.D reluctantly assumes his new position and is warned by the prison authorities of the rampant drug abuse and violence there, but J.D pays no heed. Sabari and Manikandan are two brothers, who are supposed to surrender for one of Bhavani's murders. They slip a note to an unknown J.D and later that night try to call him while he is drunk. When they are caught, Bhavani kills them and their bodies are discovered hanging from the ceiling of the detention center classroom the next day. 

J.D is detained for the murders. A grief-stricken Charu admonishes J.D for his negligent behavior, revealing that she was the one who had signed him up for the job, believing him to be the only teacher capable of understanding the needs of the inmates. She reveals herself as an NGO worker investigating the crimes occurring in the facility; the brothers had desperately contacted her for help. While in detention, J.D. discovers the brothers' note, detailing the horrific activities taking place inside the center. Heartbroken, he clobbers Bhavani's goons who had been dispatched to kill him and calls Bhavani, promising to make him pay for the boys' deaths. Having quit drinking, J.D slowly gains control over the institution and begins to reform the inmates. His actions are opposed by Das, an older inmate (found to be an adult) responsible for controlling the younger children.

With the assistance of a young inmate, Undiyal, J.D discovers that Bhavani regularly makes the inmates take the blame for his crimes. He records the video of the younger inmates including Undiyal, speaking about Das's crimes in the facility. Bhavani's goons target Charu and retrieve the video from her, sparing her only because of Undiyal's intervention. Undiyal reveals that select inmates are tattooed with the Tamil letter 'ப' (Pa), which allows unrestricted access to free food and drugs from Bhavani's associates in exchange for surrendering for his crimes. J.D raids the respective establishments and cuts off the drug supply to the detention facility, much to Bhavani's frustration. He also sneaks into Bhavani's hideout and threatens him and his men with dire consequences, while unknowingly holding Bhavani at knifepoint using a ball pen. Bhavani retaliates by killing some of J.D's batchmates and ex-students. 

With J.D incapacitated by grief, Das abducts most of the inmates, intending to take them out of Tamil Nadu along with Bhavani's Benami documents. With the help of his friend and expert archer Vanathi, J.D defeat Das's men and rescues the children. J.D confronts Das and makes him realize Bhavani will kill him because he is the link between Bhavani and the crimes in the detention facility. Das reforms and transports J.D to Bhavani's meatpacking plant along with the children. Das overpowers the men sent to kill him while J.D confronts Bhavani. Although Bhavani gets the upper hand, J.D manages to defeat Bhavani, who later urges J.D to join him in politics, but J.D kills him, thus avenging Sabari and Manikandan's death. With the children safe, J.D and Das surrender to the police. The detention facility is shut down by the government, with the inmates being sent to other detention facilities and state prisons, based on their age. J.D, Das, and the other adults from the facility are sent to prison, where they intend to reform the inmates there.

Cast 

Director Lokesh Kanagaraj and co-writer Rathna Kumar make cameo appearances as prisoners during the end credits.

Production

Development 

In March 2019, sources claimed that after Bigil (2019), Vijay will be working with Mohan Raja's next film. However, in May 2019, it was also announced that he will be working with Lokesh Kanagaraj for his 64th venture, which will be produced by Xavier Britto. Britto who is a relative of Vijay, produced three films for the actor, Sendhoorapandi (1993), Rasigan (1994) and Deva (1995), all of which were directed by Vijay's father S. A. Chandrasekhar. On 22 May 2019, it was reported that Vijay gave a call sheet for 120 days. Sneha Britto, producer Britto's daughter, was confirmed to be the film's creative producer. An official announcement was made on 24 August 2019, by producer Britto, under his newly launched production banner XB Film Creators. Lalit Kumar of Seven Screen Studio co-produced the film, along with Vijay's manager Jagadish Palaniswamy. Along with the news, he revealed some of the crew that will work on the film, with Anirudh Ravichander being announced as the music director and Silva for stunt choreography. Sathyan Sooryan and Philomin Raj were retained as the cinematographer and editor respectively for this film, after previously collaborated on the director's Kaithi. Originally launched under the tentative title Thalapathy 64, the official title Master was announced on 31 December 2019 (New Year's Eve).

Casting 
In July 2019, it was reported that Arjun will be a part of the film as antagonist. However, the role went to Vijay Sethupathi. Kiara Advani, Raashi Khanna and Rashmika Mandanna, were reported to play the female leads, before Malavika Mohanan was finalised. The cast additions included Shanthanu Bhagyaraj and Antony Varghese, with the latter making his Tamil debut. But Varghese later left the project, citing scheduling conflicts and was later replaced by Arjun Das, who was a part of Lokesh's previous venture, Kaithi. Andrea Jeremiah also signed to be a part of the film in October 2019, followed by Brigida Saga and Gouri G. Kishan. Ramya Subramanian also joined the film's second schedule. The film's cast additions also included, Nassar, Sanjeev, Sriman, Srinath, Prem, Nagendra Prasad, Mahendran amongst others. Raveena Ravi dubbed Malavika Mohanan's voice. Actor Kathir's father made his acting debut with this film. In January 2021, it was reported that Nani and Madhavan were approached for Vijay Sethupathi's role before Sethupathi was finalised. Surekha Vani also made appearance in the film, but her scenes were not included in the final cut.

Filming 

Principal photography began with a pooja ceremony on 3 October 2019; the film's cast and crew were present at the event. On 4 October, director Rathna Kumar posted on Twitter that he was co-writing the screenplay for this project along with Lokesh. Pon Parthiban, who previously collaborated with Kanagaraj in Kaithi, was signed to co-write the screenplay with Kanagaraj and Kumar. The film's first schedule took place in Chennai for 15 days. Post the completion of the first schedule, the film's team planned for a 20-day schedule in Delhi. Vijay and the film's crew members went to Delhi for the second schedule in November 2019. Stills from the film's shooting spot at Shri Ram College of Commerce in the North Campus, where a song sequence is being filmed, which found its way to the internet, went viral. The film's shoot briefly delayed due to pollution in Delhi. After few pictures from the film's shooting spots were leaked, the team proceeded to have the images removed under the Digital Millennium Copyright Act (DMCA).

The crew went to film few important scenes, featuring Vijay and Vijay Sethupathi at Shimoga district in Karnataka after the Delhi schedule being completed. However, the makers planned to shoot few scenes in Chennai, before the schedule. Shanthanu and Sethupathi went to Shimoga in December 2019. Art director Satheesh Kumar, stated in an interview, that more than 15 sets were made on the film's shoot, with one of them being the Metro train sets, which is being used for the first time in Tamil cinema. The makers went to film fight scenes featuring Sethupathi and Vijay at the Neyveli Lignite Corporation (NLC). However the film's shoot was interrupted twice, when Vijay was summoned by the Income tax officials on 5 February, about potential tax evasion, and later on 7 February, when members of Bharatiya Janata Party, protested in front of the NLC. The film's shooting wrapped in February 2020, within 129 working days. For their roles in the film, both Vijay and Jeremiah underwent archery training. A portion of the sequence featuring Lokesh and Rathna Kumar appearing in the end credits of the film, was directed by Vijay, which was the first attempt in direction in his career.

Post-production 
The film's post-production works which began in March 2020, soon after the completion of the film's shoot was halted due to the COVID-19 lockdown in India. After the Tamil Nadu government granted permission to resume post-production activities in May 2020, Master became one of the few films to resume works. The team reported that most of the film's works including dubbing were completed before the lockdown, except for the editing works which was resumed on 11 May 2020. Composer Anirudh Ravichander, took to Twitter stating that he started his works on the film's background score.

The runtime of the film's final cut consists of 181 minutes, before being sent to the officials of the Central Board of Film Certification on 14 December 2020. The officials granted U/A certificate to the film due to scenes featuring violence and bloodshed, and with a duration of 178 minutes before censoring. The team revealed it officially on 24 December 2020, with a tweet posted through social media. There were reports claiming that an uncensored version of the film will be made available in its digital release, with few shots which were not included in the theatrical cut.  However LetsOTT, a digital media company website claimed that the film will not contain additional scenes but instead the abusive words will not be censored in this version. A deleted scene of the film with a duration of four minutes was released in February 2021.

Themes and influences 

Film critic Sudhir Srinivasan explained about the references of pointing several films including 7G Rainbow Colony, Vaaranam Aayiram, Mouna Ragam, Kadhal Kottai and Premam. In the film, JD references the scenes as examples about the reason for why he became an alcoholic. However, it was referred that he was a student of Professar Selvam, a character played by Kamal Haasan in Nammavar, whom he considered as an inspiration and becomes alcoholic after his loss. Many reports claimed that the film is inspired from the South Korean film Silenced, however writer Pon Parthiban stated that the film is a real-life story, based on a person he is familiar with. Vijay's character and the introductory sequence was inspired from the film Baby Driver (2017), where the titular character Baby (Ansel Elgort), finds catharsis in music, and the character was also being modelled from the latter. His character drew inspiration from that of Clint Eastwood's role in the Dollars Trilogy, where the protagonist was not allowed to tell about his backstory.

Many critics had praised the director Kanagaraj for the portrayal of Vijay as a "flawed hero" apart from the "regular commercial star". A critic from The News Minute wrote an article about Vijay's portrayal and also the usual political references in the film, but stated that the "politics is as flawed as Vijay's character". His character John Durairaj (JD) was described as a loner, sombre, alcoholic and also a person who is willing to help, only if he is asked to do so, while Sethupathi's character Bhavani as a god-fearing and who does not prefer drugs and alcoholism, irrespective of his evil nature. Critics opened about the negative aspects (Achilles' heel or the weakness) of the protagonist which was predominantly shown throughout the film, in contrast to the novel The Hero's Journey written by Joseph Campbell, where the negative traits of a protagonist were not shown throughout the film.

In an interview with critic Baradwaj Rangan of Film Companion South, Lokesh Kanagaraj, who is a fan of Haasan, explained the connection between the two films and also credited in the film's filmography. Srinivasan also referred to the 2015 film Thani Oruvan pointing the neo-noir characterisation of the actors Vijay and Sethupathi stating "the film is constantly intercutting between developments in their respective lives, as their trajectories hurtle towards each other—even if not as methodically". Lokesh confessed that he wanted to do Master entirely according to his style, for which Vijay agreed, but he did not do so due to Vijay's stardom and value.

Music 
The film's soundtrack album and background music is composed by Anirudh Ravichander, with lyrics written by Arunraja Kamaraj, Gana Balachandar, Arivu, Vignesh Shivan, Vishnu Edavan and Bjorn Surrao. The album features eight tracks with three singles — "Kutti Story", "Vaathi Coming" and "Vaathi Raid" — were released before the launch. The audio was released at a launch event held on 15 March 2020, at the Leela Palace Hotel in Chennai and was aired live on Sun TV. Despite the album being released in its entirety, two songs "Vaathi Kabaddi" and "Master The Blaster" were unveiled as a part of the extended soundtrack album. As of April 2021, the album crossed more than 5 billion streams in all music streaming platforms.

Release

Theatrical 
Master was released on 13 January 2021, a day before Pongal, in over 1000 theatres in Tamil Nadu. The film was originally scheduled for a theatrical release on 9 April 2020, but as the Tamil Nadu government led by Chief Minister Edappadi K. Palaniswami announced for a closure of theatres so as to curb COVID-19 pandemic spread, the film was postponed indefinitely. The film's director, producer and other technical crew members assured the plans of theatrical release, as the film is made for a "big-screen experience". The film was rumoured to be released on Diwali (14 November 2020), after the Tamil Nadu government permitted reopening of theatres, four days before the festival, on 10 November, which did not happen. It is for the first time, Vijay did not have a release in a calendar year. On 28 November 2020, the producers released a press statement, refuting rumours of releasing the film on any over-the-top (OTT) media service, and also reiterating plans for a theatrical release, as this decision was crucial for the revival of the film industry, which had suffered unprecedented losses due to the pandemic.

In December 2020, the makers officially announced that the film will be released on 13 January 2021. Additionally, dubbed versions of the film would also release simultaneously in Telugu, Kannada and Malayalam. However, the Malayalam version do not released theatrically. The Telugu version of Master was released across 600 theatres in Andhra Pradesh and Telangana. In Kerala the film opened in 200 theatres, was considered to be the first release in Kerala, as theatres reopened on that date. It is mostly due to the theatre owners strike against the Kerala government demanding relief package and tax exemption, delayed the reopening of theatres, although the central government permitted to resume the operation of theatres and multiplexes in mid-October 2020. The advance bookings of the film started from 7 January in limited theatres across Tamil Nadu, and generated record number of ticket sales for the opening weekend.

Due to the demand of the film's dubbed version in North India, the filmmakers officially announced a release of its Hindi version titled as Vijay The Master, which was scheduled for a release on 14 January 2021, across North Indian theatres. The film received an additional 500 screens in Central India, Rajasthan, Delhi, Uttar Pradesh, and Punjab, for the film's Tamil, Telugu and Hindi versions, irrespective of being released in 2000 screens. The film was not released in the United Kingdom and Canada due to COVID-19 restrictions.

Distribution 
The film's pre-release business, which includes theatrical, overseas, satellite, digital, music and dubbing rights were sold for 200 crore prior to the COVID-19 pandemic. However, closer to the film's release, it was reported that the film had done a pre-release business of 158.3 crore. Master worldwide distribution rights acquired by S. S. Lalit Kumar of Seven Screen Studio, who sold the film to its area-wise sub-distributors: Shri Sai Combines (Tirunelveli and Kanyakumari), Sushma Cine Arts (Madurai), Plus Max Films (Tiruchirappalli and Thanjavur), Sri Raj Films (Salem), Kanthasamy Arts Films Distributors (Coimbatore), 5 Star Senthil (North and South Arcot), Dhanam Pictures (Chengalpattu), Sri Karpaga Vinayaga Film Circuits (Chennai). Prithviraj Sukumaran bought the distribution rights of the film in Kerala, under his Prithviraj Productions banner. Dheeraj Enterprises and Mahesh Koneru's East Coast Productions acquired the distribution rights for Karnataka and Andhra Pradesh-Telangana regions respectively while United India Exporters and Malik Streams bought the overseas rights. The film's Hindi and North India release rights were sold to B4U Motion Pictures. Lotus Five Star bought the distribution rights in Malaysia and Singapore.

Marketing 
The teaser trailer of the film released on Diwali, 14 November 2020, The teaser of this film garnered more than 50 million views, and 2.5 million likes upon release, becoming the most-viewed and most-liked South Indian film teaser, until its record was beaten by the teaser of K.G.F: Chapter 2 (2021), which surpassed more than 78 million views, within 4.2 million likes within 24 hours of its release. The teaser for the Telugu version was released on 17 December 2020, and teaser for the Hindi version titled Vijay The Master, was released on 7 January 2021.

To promote the film, a new Twitter emoji was launched on the New Year's Day, 1 January 2021. On late December 2020, the makers collaborated with Silaii Sculptures, as their official merchandise partner, launching a new sculpture based on Vijay's look from the film. Later, Fully Filmy unveiled the official merchandise of Master in January 2021. On 8 January 2021, the makers hosted a pre-release event in Hyderabad, to promote the film's Telugu version.

Home media 
The film's digital rights were acquired by Amazon Prime Video for 51.5 crores, and was premiered on 29 January 2021, 16 days after the film's theatrical release. The film's television premiere took place on Sun TV on 14 April 2021, along with its dubbed versions. The Malayalam version of the film was telecast through Surya TV on the same day. The digital and satellite rights of the Hindi-dubbed version were acquired by Zee Network. Vijay The Master, premiered on 15 March 2021 through the ZEE5 platform, whilst its television premiere took place on Zee Cinema on 30 May 2021 and fetched record viewership.

Controversies 
Master was in the news for several controversies, the first being the raid by Income Tax Department at Vijay's residence on 5 February 2020. Vijay was inquired about potential tax evasion, when he was busy shooting for the film in Neyveli, regarding his investment in immovable properties which he inherited from the production studio AGS Entertainment, the company which had previously produced Bigil (2019). Later, the I-T department said that nothing significant was found during the raid and Vijay has paid all taxes. Two days later, on 7 February 2020, members of the Bharatiya Janata Party (BJP) protested in front of the Neyveli Lignite Corporation (NLC) where its shooting was going on. The BJP members protested against the NLC administration for granting permission for the shoot. Although the film crew had obtained permission, the members of the BJP claimed that it is a highly secured area and it's not a place for a film shooting; they also threatened to continue their protests if the shooting did not stop.

After its theatrical release postponed to 9 April 2020, due to the COVID-19 pandemic lockdown in India, the film was later rescheduled to 13 January 2021, following a nine-month long delay, since the makers assured the film is made for "big-screen experience". The makers were given permission to release the film with 100% seating capacity in theatres with forthcoming other Tamil films by the Government of Tamil Nadu after Vijay personally requested chief minister Edappadi K. Palaniswami, despite the increase in COVID-19 cases in India, especially Tamil Nadu. The Central Government of India issued a warrant against the Tamil Nadu government's decision to approve the release of the films with 100% seating capacity. saying that it is clearly in violation of the guidelines of the Minister of Home Affairs which only allows 50% seat occupancy in theatres. Many doctors too protested against this, and soon after, Central Government notice was passed and it was revoked back to 50% seating capacity in Tamil Nadu theatres.

A day prior to the release on 12 January 2021, some of the film scenes were reportedly leaked by few anonymous people in social media which triggered controversy in the film fraternity. Lokesh Kanagaraj and Malavika Mohanan openly urged the audience not to share the film leaked scenes with others and requested them to watch the film in theatres maintaining relevant safety precautions. Twitter later assisted the production team of the film to find who leaked the film scenes in the internet and which was revealed that a person who worked for a digital company for which the film copy was sold for distribution rights abroad had allegedly stolen the copy of the film and leaked them. The film was scheduled for a digital release on Amazon Prime Video on 29 January 2021 within 16 days after its theatrical run, which is a first-of-a-kind for an Indian film. This eventually led to disappointing response from theatre owners citing threats from piracy sites. Despite requests, the team proceeded with the digital premiere, and later theatre owners announced that no film should premiere in a streaming platform less than 30 days of its theatrical release.

Reception

Box office 

In its opening day, the film collected 25 crore in the Tamil Nadu box office, with ₹1.21 crore from Chennai theatres. Producer Xavier Britto officially confirmed the news of its first day collection, through the production company's Twitter account. The film earned ₹4.30 crore from Karnataka, ₹9.40 crore from Andhra Pradesh-Telangana region, ₹2.10 crore from Kerala and ₹70 lakhs from rest of the parts in India, totalling up to ₹40.40 crore in India. In its second day of release, the film earned ₹21.20 crore at the Indian box office, thus crossing the ₹50 crore mark, and the film also collected ₹14.20 crore in Tamil Nadu, there by crossing the 40-crore mark. The film earned ₹110 crore in the worldwide box office, crossing the 100-crore mark in three days, as well as the 50-crore mark in the Tamil Nadu box office collections. In its final run, the film crossed  crore in the state, becoming the highest grossing film of 2021 in that state, until it was surpassed by Annaatthe, which crossed  crore.

At the closing of its first week box office collections, the film earned ₹140 crore at the worldwide box office within nine days of its release. Further, the film collected ₹100 crore in the Tamil Nadu box office, thus becoming the actor's fourth consecutive film to do so after Mersal, Sarkar and Bigil. The film was a profitable venture in Andhra Pradesh and Telangana, collecting 9.20 crore share in first three days. The Hindi dubbed version Vijay The Master collected 9 crore. Master also crossed the 10-crore mark at the Chennai city box office, and also surpassed the lifetime collection of Theri, at the city box office grossing 11.56 crore within 33 days. The film also collected a share of 80 crore in Tamil Nadu, surpassing Baahubali 2: The Conclusion which earlier collected 78 crore.

Master was the highest-grossing film in United Arab Emirates, collecting $1.4 million within two days, surpassing Wonder Woman 1984 and Tenet. Since its release according to Deadline Hollywood, it became the biggest post-pandemic worldwide release as well as the highest-grossing film in international markets and also topped the global box office rankings at the time of release. It was the first Indian film to have occupied No 1 in the global box office at the time of release. The film earned ₹4.60 crore from Australia, ₹0.90 crore from New Zealand, ₹8.00 crore from Singapore, ₹3.30 crore from United States, ₹19.00 crore from UAE and Middle East and in the rest of the world it earned ₹8.00 crore.

The Indian Express stated that the film grossed 220 crore worldwide. According to Box Office India, the film grossed 230 crore worldwide in its lifetime and remained the highest grossing film in India post the pandemic, until it was surpassed by Sooryavanshi (2021). India Today stated that the film grossed 250 crore. The News Minute published that the film grossed 300 crore worldwide. However, trade analysts said that the collections of the film could not be compared to Vijay's Bigil or any other previous films due to the pandemic situation.

Critical response 

Master received positive reviews from critics.  

M Suganth of The Times of India gave three-and-a-half out of five and wrote, "The charismatic performances of Vijay and Vijay Sethupathi that keeps us rooting." LM Kaushik of Sify wrote, "Master is a different Vijay film as well as a different Lokesh film. Thalapathy just keeps growing from strength to strength while Lokesh leaves his mark in the ‘mass hero’ genre too. Despite its pace issues and the length, ‘JD’ Vijay and ‘Bhavani’ Vijay make it worthwhile" and gave three-and-a-half out of five stars. S. Srivatsan of The Hindu wrote that although the film is "a bit drag and flab," the film breaks several tropes associated with the "Vijay formula." Ranjani Krishnakumar of Firstpost gave a rating of two-and-a-half out of five stating "Master is unfortunately the kind of film that concerns itself with too many things but can hardly focus on any of it beyond adorning the hero." Saibal Chatterjee of NDTV criticised the film's length but wrote, "Master is overlong all right, but Vijay and Vijay Sethupathi make a winning combination. Buoyed by a fantastic score by Anirudh Ravichander, here is a film that, for all its flaws, is keenly aware of the star power at its disposal and seldom punches below its weight." India Todays Janani K described Lokesh's script as "boring" and criticised the nearly three-hour runtime, but called Vijay's performance as a flawed character an improvement over his usual roles as "a righteous man belting out socially-conscious messages" and also praised the soundtrack.

Manoj Kumar, chief critic of The Indian Express wrote "Master is neither completely a Vijay film nor entirely a Lokesh Kanagaraj film. Lokesh's self-imposed limitations and obligation to be in fan-service undermine the film's impact. He has used so many good talents as just fillers and wasted resources on ideas that don't take the story forward. And, those are not the qualities of Lokesh who made Maanagaram and Kaithi." Behindwoods gave three out of five stars stating that "Master scores well as a perfect commercial film that will satisfy Vijay, Vijay Sethupathi and Lokesh fans". Film critic Shubham Kulkarni of Koimoi.com gave three-and-a-half out of five, stating "Master is not the best or most perfect, but it is a entertaining. You will have to have a suspension of disbelief, but then once Vijays begin the action, they sell it in the package." However, Karthik Keramalu of The Quint was more critical on the film rating two out of five and opined that "Master wouldn't have become a drastically different movie, if the film lack a few illogical elements. Maybe, if the entire film had been about Bhavani alone, it would have been fun!" Baradwaj Rangan of Film Companion South wrote "There's one part of us waiting to see 'A Lokesh Kanagaraj Film'. There's another part of us waiting for 'A Vijay Entertainer'. The film is a not-bad balance." Anna Smith of Deadline Hollywood wrote "Master may deliver its lessons with a heavy hand, but it's got the charisma to see you through." Ananda Vikatan rated the film 43 out of 100.

Accolades

Impact 
Although its release was pushed to January 2021, Master was listed in the Most Anticipated Tamil Films of 2020, in the articles listed by Firstpost and The Indian Express. The film topped the list of most tweeted hashtags about movies, in a survey report by Twitter India. The #MasterSelfie where Vijay took a selfie along with his fans in a shooting spot from Neyveli, became the most retweeted tweet in India of 2020. Many prominent industry analysts supported Master, as it was the first-mainstream Indian film to be released post-the COVID-19 lockdown. Prior to the release, the film notched 80% higher ticket sales in BookMyShow, beating Vijay's previous film Bigil (2019).

Dhanush tweeted about the theatrical release of Master, in which he asked fans to follow the safety precautions, while watching the film. Silambarasan also requested the same during the audio launch of his film Eeswaran (2021), for fans to watch films in theatres, following the necessary guidelines for safety. Director Mysskin and actress Raadhika, also praised the actor's decision to release the film in theatres, as well as many producers and distributors. Malayalam actors Vineeth Sreenivasan, Kalyani Priyadarshan and Pranav Mohanlal, who worked in Hridayam, praised the film. Standup comedian-cum-actor Karthik Kumar too praised the film and Vijay, for allowing Vijay Sethupathi's performance getting well-received through the film. At the pre-release event of Uppena, where Vijay Sethupathi played a key role in the film, Chiranjeevi praised the actor's performance in that launch event.

Indian cricketer Ravichandran Ashwin praised the film and also the performances of Vijay and Vijay Sethupathi. At the test match between India and England held in Chennai, Ashwin grooved to the song "Vaathi Coming" when it is played during the test match. The video went viral across the release and Ashwin, Kuldeep Yadav and Hardik Pandya, did the shoulder drop step in a cover video posted on 19 February 2021. The song "Vaathi Coming" reached phenomenal response and many Indian celebrities such as Shilpa Shetty, Nazriya Nazim, Varalaxmi Sarathkumar and Genelia D'Souza recreated the signature step which went viral through social media. Cricketer Harbhajan Singh recreated the step during the shooting of Friendship, his acting debut, as did David Warner. Suresh Raina grooved to the song at the Behindwoods Gold Medals awards held on 7 March 2021, where he was awarded The Global Icon of Inspiration: Sports, by the director Lokesh Kanagaraj.

Post Master's success, many North Indian trade exhibitors suggested Bollywood industry, to release their films post-pandemic. Many sources reported that Master was noted for the revival of theatrical business, irrespective of the box-office collections. An article based on the film's theatrical release and anticipation surrounded towards the film was published by ESPNcricinfo, the online news portal of ESPN, for cricket-related sources, before the first test match between India and England was held in Chennai, without spectators. Theatre owners in Tamil Nadu claimed that, despite the revival of theatrical business, none of the films which released after Master, received a similar success as the latter due to non-gripping content and lack of promotional activities. The film topped IMDb's list of "most popular Indian films and web series" during June 2021. The Indian Express named Master as one of the "Best Tamil Films" released during the first half of 2021.

Remake 
A day after the film's release, a Hindi remake was announced after some of the North Indian distributors were impressed with the film's output. The film's Hindi remake rights were bought by Endemol Shine India and Murad Khetani. The remake will be produced by Endemol Shine in association with Cine1 Studios and Seven Screen Studio which also co-produced and distributed the original film.

Notes

References

External links 

2020s Tamil-language films
2021 action films
2021 films
Fictional portrayals of the Tamil Nadu Police
Films about alcoholism
Films about juvenile delinquency
Films about organised crime in India
Films postponed due to the COVID-19 pandemic
Films scored by Anirudh Ravichander
Films set in 2002
Films set in Chennai
Films set in prison
Films set in universities and colleges
Films shot in Delhi
Films shot in Karnataka
Films shot in Mumbai
Indian action films
Indian prison films
2020s masala films
Films directed by Lokesh Kanagaraj